Durg Lok Sabha constituency is one of the 11 Lok Sabha constituencies in Chhattisgarh state in central India.

Assembly segments
While most Lok Sabha seats in MP and Chhattisgarh have 8 assembly seats as their segments, Durg and Raipur seats in Chhattisgarh have nine assembly segments under them, and Chhindwara and Satna Lok Sabha seats in MP have only 7 segments under them.

Durg Lok Sabha constituency is composed of the following nine assembly segments:

Members of Parliament

^ by poll

Election results

See also
 Durg district
 List of Constituencies of the Lok Sabha

References

Lok Sabha constituencies in Chhattisgarh
Durg district